Coleosoma floridanum is a species of cobweb spider in the family Theridiidae. It is found in North, Central and South America, has been introduced into Europe, Macaronesia, West Africa, the Seychelles, and the Pacific Islands.

References

External links

 

Theridiidae
Articles created by Qbugbot
Spiders described in 1900